Jean Constance Hamilton (born November 12, 1945) is a senior United States district judge of the United States District Court for the Eastern District of Missouri.

Education and career

Born in St. Louis, Missouri, Hamilton received a Bachelor of Arts degree from Wellesley College in 1968, then a Juris Doctor from Washington University School of Law in 1971, and a Master of Laws from Yale Law School in 1982. She was an attorney with the Civil Rights Division of the United States Department of Justice in Washington, D.C. from 1971 to 1973. She was then an Assistant United States Attorney for the Eastern District of Missouri from 1973 to 1978. She was corporate counsel to Southwestern Bell Telephone Company in St. Louis from 1978 to 1981.

State judicial service

In 1982, Hamilton became a Circuit judge for Missouri's Twenty-second Judicial Circuit, and in 1988, she was elevated to the Missouri Court of Appeals, Eastern District. During her service as a state court judge, Hamilton was an adjunct professor, teaching at St. Louis University Law School from 1986 to 1987, and in 1989, and at Washington University School of Law from 1987 to 1992.

Federal judicial service

On August 3, 1990, President George H. W. Bush nominated Hamilton to a seat on the United States District Court for the Eastern District of Missouri vacated by John Francis Nangle. She was confirmed by the United States Senate on September 28, 1990, and received her commission on October 1, 1990. She served as Chief Judge from 1995 to 2002. She took senior status on July 1, 2013.

References

Sources
 

1945 births
Living people
Assistant United States Attorneys
Judges of the United States District Court for the Eastern District of Missouri
Missouri Court of Appeals judges
Missouri state court judges
United States district court judges appointed by George H. W. Bush
20th-century American judges
Washington University School of Law alumni
Wellesley College alumni
Yale Law School alumni
21st-century American judges
20th-century American women judges
21st-century American women judges
Saint Louis University faculty
Washington University in St. Louis faculty